The European Foundation for Quality in eLearning (EFQUEL) was a not-for-profit organisation which was legally established on June 30, 2005,
and is based in Brussels, Belgium. It was a worldwide membership network with over 120 member organisations including universities, corporations and national agencies.  The purpose of the foundation was to create a European community of users and experts to share experiences of eLearning. Two of the main initiatives of the foundation were the "UNIQUe" accreditation for Quality in e-Learning and the annual EFQUEL Forum.

History 

The European Federation for Quality in E-Learning (EFQUEL) was a Non-Profit Association which had its origins in three successful European eLearning projects, all in the field of quality in E-Learning in Europe. EFQUEL approached quality in E-Learning from complementary perspectives and developed full-scale services for all educational fields, regional contexts and target groups. The Federation provided support, transparency, open participation and leadership for a broad range of topics.

Over the years, EFQUEL developed a quality portfolio that covered the quality of both products and programmes in the field of technology-enhanced learning:

 The UNIQUe quality label focuses on the use of ICT to enhance educational provision and learning support, throughout the entire breadth of activity of the Higher Education Institution. This sophisticated approach demands an applicant to meet high quality standards for programme objectives, programme structure, content, resources and learning processes. 
 Also EFQUEL hosted ECBCheck which is a new accreditation and quality improvement scheme for E-Learning programmes and institutions in international Capacity Building. It supports capacity building organisations to measure how successful their e-learning programmes are and allows for continuous improvement though peer collaboration and bench-learning.

In Q1 2012, more than 120 organisations participated in EFQUEL's network. These included universities like the KULeuven, United Nations University, University of Jyväskylä, Politecnico Milano -METID, Vytautas Magnus University, University of Belgrade, the Universita Oberta de Cataluniya, and 50 more universities, also corporations such as Toshiba Europe or Adobe, other European networks and political bodies

EFQUEL closed at the end of 2014.

Governance

EFQUEL was governed by a board of directors of currently 12 people (2012). There is a list at the time that EFQUEL closed.

Activities

EFQUEL's main activities involved the creation and operation of e-learning tools and labels, as well as the organisation of the yearly EFQUEL Innovation Forum - a multidisciplinary conference which brought together experts in learning from around the world to discuss the latest innovations in learning and teaching.

Quality certifications and tools

EFQUEL operated the following quality tools and labels:
 UNIQUe - a label for quality use of ICT (Information and Communication Technologies) by Higher Education Institutions
 ECB-Check - a quality label for e-learning programmes
 Sevaq+ - a tool for designing and running self-assessment and shared-assessment processes in e-learning.

Project partnerships

EFQUEL participated in European projects both as an initiator as well as an active project partner. EFQUEL was mainly involved in projects that focus on innovation, open access and quality assurance within various educational models and sectors.  EFQUEL supported the process of developing and implementing quality frameworks and tools, assisted in research and content development, and set up peer review processes and other quality assurance processes and disseminates results among its network.

Policy and research papers

During the past few years, EFQUEL developed a series of papers to enter into the discussion regarding quality and technology enhanced learning.

UNIQUe Certification
The UNIQUe Certification is a quality label awarded to Higher Education Institutions, for quality use of ICT (Information and Communication Technologies). The label is managed by the EFQUEL, and was co-developed by the MENON Network, EFMD, and Europace.

The quality of both products and programs in the field of technology-enhanced learning varies widely. The UNIQUe quality label is a unique concept of quality improvement which is theoretically sound and at the same time is meeting the expectations of practice.

Many of the existing quality initiatives in this field focus heavily, if not solely, on online instructional design. The UNIQUe approach goes above and beyond this, focusing on the use of ICT to enhance educational provision and learning support, throughout the entire breadth of activity of the Higher Education Institution. This sophisticated approach demands an applicant to meet high-quality standards for program objectives, program structure, content, resources and learning processes.

For who
The fundamental feature of the UNIQUe approach is to support institutions of higher education to measure how successful they are in technology-enhanced learning and to allow for continuous improvement. Thus,

- UNIQUe is an accelerator for quality improvement and innovation. 
- Providing industry-wide benchmarks, it will dramatically enhance the implementation speed of the Bologna reforms in the area of technology-enhanced learning.
- Compared to other quality initiatives in the area of technology-enhanced learning, UNIQUe has a broader institutional approach and is not only related to e Learning. The - Unique quality label builds on the broadest stakeholder involvement.
- The UNIQUe process is structured in six very distinct stages and offers a formalized approach in each of the steps.
- The UNIQUe quality label provides a certification as a result, next to continuous quality improvement mechanisms.
- The UNIQUe quality label focuses on innovation. UNIQUe ensures continuous quality improvement since it is a diagnostic tool for self-assessment of the institution.

The process
The UNIQUe Process is made up of six steps, namely:
 Application
 Eligibility: The Institution is checked for overall compliance with the UNIQUe scheme
 Self-Assessment: The institution embarks on a process of self-analysis and assessment, completing a questionnaire about its processes, and submitting back to a review team.
 Peer Review: A three-person review team visits the Institution, to check compliance with the UNIQUe Criteria.
 Awarding Body: An independent awarding body, recommends certification or rejection, based upon the recommendation of the reviewers.
 Continuous Quality Improvement: the institution's development of ICT policies is continuously monitored, in line with recommendations made by the review team.

References

Sources
ENQA Workshop Report on Quality Assurance in e-Learning Workshop Report

External links 
EFQUEL website
UNIQUE website

Higher education organisations based in Europe
Information technology organizations based in Europe
International educational organizations
International organisations based in Belgium
Organizations established in 2005